Herbertpur is a town and a nagar panchayat in Dehradun district Pachhhwadoon in the Indian state of Uttarakhand.

Geography
Herbertpur is located on the bank of river Asan and the name of the place is on the name of Sir Herbert (British) the old name of Herbertpur is Soannagar . It has an average elevation of 427 metres (1,401 feet). It is a beautiful place in between Shivalik and Himalayas range. There are many spots near this place,i.e. Asan Barage, Rampur Mandi, Dakpather, Kattapatthar, and a natural swimming pool (Bawri), Kalsi and others.

Demographics
 India census, Herbertpur had a population of 9,782 and is spread over 3.82 square km. Males are 5,145 in number (52%) and females 4,637 (48%). Herbertpur has an average literacy rate of 69%, higher than the national average of 59.5%: male literacy is 75%, and female literacy is 63%. In Herbertpur, 13% of the population is under 6 years of age.

Government and politics 
Herbertpur town is an urban area under the administration of a Nagar Panchayat (NP). It has 7 wards under it.

Overview
This place is also known for Christian Hospital Herbertpur (known as Lehman Hospital), which was set by Christian missionary Dr. Geoffrey D. Lehman to provide necessary medical care to the nearby villages and hill people of Jaunsar Bawar and Himachal Pradesh. The Tehsil Campus and Civil Court of Vikasnagar is also situated in the surroundings of Herbertpur. This place is very well known to the tourists as it is very well connected to the roads joining to Himachal Pradesh, U.P., and Jaunsar Bawar.  The rehabilitation camps for Tibetan people are also in this area.

Places to visit
Herbertpur is a great spot to visit as it has beautiful places like Dak Pather and Katta Pather. The nearest Hill Station is Chakrata which is about 45 km from Herbertpur.
Herbertpur houses the Dakk Pathar Dam. It is in close proximity to various hill stations like Chakrata, Mussourie. It lies close to Paunta Sahib and Dehradun. NHW 123 passes through Vikasnagar. It leads to Yamunotri. Herbertpur and Vikasnagar are known as a market for remote villages of the tribal region of Jaunsar Bhabhar. Herbertpur is also famous for exporting quality basmati rice and fruits like litchi and dussehere mangoes. Herbertpur has many mango plantations, of which some of the famous are Bhandari Mango Farm and Kunja Mango Farms. Herbertpur has widely been known for its natural swimming pool called Baawdi. It is generally believed that Lord Ram visited this place during Treta Yuga and relieved Ahilya from her curse given to her by her husband Gautam Rishi.

Also, one can visit places like Asan Barrage, which has now become a world-renowned hotspot for bird watching. Many national and international ornithologists come here to observe rare and very rare bird species which come here from as far as Siberia, Russia.
Close by is Ranpur Mandi, a mini zoo on the bank of Yamuna where one can see some local fauna and get some peace on the banks of ever vibrant water of Yamuna.
Also the walk near Shakti Nahar at Dhakrani Colony is a peaceful experience in itself as the natural flora, and mountains studded with greenery surround it. Sitting in the Dhakrani Colony Cricket ground gives the impression that one is sitting in the International Stadium of Dharmshala, HP. It is very stress-relieving seeing kids playing cricket in this picturesque ground, famously known as Eden Gardens of Herbertpur.

References

External links
 Herbertpur, Official website

Cities and towns in Dehradun district